There are three different ballot propositions in California called Proposition 1A:
 California Proposition 1A (2004), about protecting local funding being repurposed for state usage.
 California Proposition 1A (2008), about funding for high-speed rail in California.
 California Proposition 1A (2009), about state finances.